Pugach is a surname. Notable people with the surname include:

 Alina Pugach (born 1993), Israeli badminton player
 Burt Pugach (19272020), disbarred American lawyer, known for blinding his ex-mistress with lye and subsequently marrying her
 Leon Pugach (born 1972), Israeli badminton player
 Yuval Pugach (born 2001), Israeli badminton player